United States v. Lee may refer to either of the following United States Supreme Court decisions:
 United States v. Lee, 106 U.S. 196 (1882), a decision ruling that prohibition on lawsuits against the federal government did not extend to officers of the government themselves
 United States v. Lee, 274 U.S. 559 (1927), a prohibition-era decision allowing the U.S. Coast Guard to search and seize vessels outside U.S. territorial waters if the occupants are suspected of consuming or transporting alcohol
 United States v. Lee, 455 U.S. 25 (1982), a decision ruling that an Amish group who are religiously opposed to the national Social Security system are not exempt from the requirement